The following outline is provided as an overview of and topical guide to engineering:

Engineering is the scientific discipline and profession that applies scientific theories, mathematical methods, and empirical evidence to design, create, and analyze technological solutions cognizant of safety, human factors, physical laws, regulations, practicality, and cost.

Branches of engineering  
 Applied engineering – application of management, design, and technical skills for the design and integration of systems, the execution of new product designs, the improvement of manufacturing processes, and the management and direction of physical and/or technical functions of a firm or organization.
Packaging engineering
 Biological engineering
 Agricultural engineering
 Bionics
 Genetic engineering
 Biomedical engineering
 Metabolic engineering
 Neural engineering
 Tissue engineering
  Civil engineering
 Environmental engineering
 Architectural engineering
 Construction engineering
 Geotechnical engineering
 Transportation engineering
 Hydro engineering
 Structural engineering
 Urban engineering (municipal engineering)
 Architectonics
 Chemical engineering (outline)
 Materials engineering
 Molecular engineering
 Process engineering – also appears under industrial engineering
 Electrical engineering (outline)
 Broadcast engineering
 Computer engineering (outline)
 Power systems engineering
 Telecommunications engineering
 Electronic engineering (includes microelectronics engineering, microelectronics and semiconductor engineering)
 Optical engineering
 Electromechanical engineering
 Control engineering (outline)
 Mechatronics
 Electromechanics
 Instrumentation engineering
 Forensic engineering
 Geological engineering
 Green engineering
 Industrial engineering 
 Engineering psychology
 Ergonomics
 Facilities engineering
 Logistic engineering
 Performance engineering
 Process engineering – also appears under chemical engineering
 Quality engineering (quality assurance engineering)
 Reliability engineering
 Safety engineering
 Security engineering
 Support engineering
 Information engineering
 Materials engineering
 Amorphous metals
 Biomaterials engineering
 Casting
 Ceramic engineering
 Composite materials
 Corrosion engineering
 Crystal engineering
 Electronic materials
 Forensic materials engineering
 Metal forming
 Metallurgical engineering
 Nanomaterials
 Plastics engineering
 Surface engineering
 Vitreous materials (glass)
 Welding
 Mechanical engineering
 Acoustical engineering – includes audio engineering
 Aerospace engineering – branch of engineering behind the design, construction and science of aircraft and spacecraft. It is broken into two major and overlapping branches:
 Aeronautical engineering – deals with craft that stay within Earth's atmosphere
 Astronautical engineering – deals with craft that operate outside of Earth's atmosphere
 Automotive engineering (automotive systems engineering)
 Manufacturing engineering
 Marine engineering
 Thermal engineering
 Naval architecture
 Sports engineering
 Vacuum engineering
 Military engineering
 Combat engineering
 Military technology
Petroleum engineering
Petroleum geology
Drilling engineering
Production engineering
Reservoir engineering
Well logging
Well testing
 Radiation engineering
 Nuclear engineering
 Radiation protection engineering
 Planetary engineering – planetary engineering is the application of technology for the purpose of influencing the global properties of a planet. The goal of this theoretical task is usually to make other worlds habitable for life. Perhaps the best-known type of planetary engineering is terraforming, by which a planet's surface conditions are altered to be more like those of Earth.
 Climate engineering (geoengineering)
 Software engineering
 Computer-aided engineering
 Knowledge engineering
 Language engineering
 Release engineering
 Teletraffic engineering
 Usability engineering
 Sustainable engineering
 Systems engineering – analysis, design, and control of gigantic engineering systems.

History of engineering  
History of engineering
 Greatest Engineering Achievements of the 20th Century
 History of chemical engineering
 History of electrical engineering
 History of mechanical engineering
 History of software engineering
 History of structural engineering
 Roman engineering
 Roman military engineering

Engineering concepts 
 Design (outline)
 Drawings 
 Computer-aided design (CAD) 
 Drafting
 Engineering design process
 Earthworks
 Ecological engineering methods
 Engineering, procurement and construction
 Engineering economics
 Cost
 Manufacturing cost
 Value-driven design
 Engineering overhead
 Engineering society
 Environmental engineering science
 Exploratory engineering
 Fasteners
 Flexibility
 Freeze
 Gate
 Good engineering practice
 Hand tools
 Machine tools
 Punch
 Management 
 Planning 
 Teamwork 
 Peopleware
 Materials
 Corrosion
 Crystallization
 Material science
 Measurement
 Model engineering
 Nanotechnology (outline)
 Non-recurring engineering
 Personalization
 Process
 Quality 
 Quality control
 Validation 
 Reverse engineering
 Risk analysis
 Structural analysis
 Structural element
 Beam
 Strut
 Tie
 Systems engineering process
 Tolerance
 Traction
 Yield

Engineering education and certification 
Engineering education
 Bachelor of Engineering
 Bachelor of Applied Science
Bachelor of Technology
 Bachelor of Biomedical Engineering
 Bachelor of Computer Science
 Bachelor of Electrical Engineering
 Bachelor of Software Engineering
 Master of Engineering
 Master of Science in Engineering
Master of Technology
 Diplôme d'Ingénieur
 Master of Applied Science
 Master of Business Engineering
 Master of Engineering Management
 Engineering doctorate
 Engineer's degree
 Engineering science and mechanics
Regulation and licensure in engineering
 Certified Engineering Technologist
 Fundamentals of Engineering exam
 Principles and Practice of Engineering Examination
 Graduate Aptitude Test in Engineering

Engineering awards 
 Academy Scientific and Technical Award
 Award of Merit in Structural Engineering
 British Construction Industry Awards
 British Engineering Excellence Awards
 Charles Stark Draper Prize
 Engineering Heritage Awards
 Engineering Leadership Award
 Federal Engineer of the Year Award
 Gordon Prize
 IEEE Control Systems Award
 Louis Schwitzer Award
 Mondialogo Engineering Award
 NAS Award in Aeronautical Engineering
 Percy Nicholls Award
 Russ Prize
 Seymour Cray Computer Engineering Award
 Software Process Achievement Award
 Technology & Engineering Emmy Award
 The Science, Engineering & Technology Student of the Year Awards

Engineering publications 
 List of engineering journals and magazines

Persons influential in the field of engineering 
 Lists of engineers

Indices 
 Index of aerospace engineering articles
 Index of electrical engineering articles
 Index of genetic engineering articles
 Index of mechanical engineering articles
 Index of software engineering articles

See also 

 Outline of architecture
 Outline of construction
 Infrastructure
 Outline of science
 Outline of technology

Engineering
Engineering

Engineering topics